"We Can Do It" is a song by Carboo released in 2000. It contains elements from "Take Your Time (Do It Right)" by American R&B group The S.O.S. Band, written by Harold Clayton and Abdullah Sigidi. The song features a male rapping the verses and a female singing the chorus.

Track listing
 "We Can Do It" (Radio Edit)
 "We Can Do It" (Original Version)
 "We Can Do It" (Pinocchio Remix Radio Edit)
 "We Can Do It" (Pinocchio Remix Original Version)

References

2000 songs